Fourth Amendment may refer to the:

Fourth Amendment to the United States Constitution, prohibits unreasonable searches and seizures
Fourth Amendment of the Constitution of Ireland, which lowered the voting age from twenty-one to eighteen
Fourth Amendment of the Constitution Bill 1968, a failed attempt to amend the Constitution of Ireland by abolishing proportional representation elections
Australian referendum, 1946 (Social Services), the fourth amendment to the Constitution of Australia, which extended the powers of the federal government over social services
Fourth Amendment of the Constitution of South Africa, which made technical changes related to the election of provincial legislature and the National Council of Provinces
Florida Amendment 4 (2018), the Voting Rights Restoration for Felons Initiative, Amendment 4, a constitutional amendment in Florida